Ljubo Vučković (22 January 1915 – 7 July 1976) was a Montenegrin general of the Yugoslav People's Army (JNA), who served as the Chief of the General Staff of the JNA from 29 April 1955 to 16 June 1961.

Previously, he held the rank of potporuchnik (junior officer) of the Royal Yugoslav Army, after graduating from the Military Academy in Belgrade in 1935, before being promoted to the rank of poruchnik (lieutenant) in 1939.

References

Literature

1915 births
1976 deaths
Military personnel from Cetinje
People of the Kingdom of Montenegro
Chiefs of Staff of the Yugoslav People's Army
Royal Yugoslav Army personnel of World War II
Yugoslav Partisans members
Montenegrin generals
Generals of the Yugoslav People's Army
League of Communists of Yugoslavia politicians
Recipients of the Order of the People's Hero
Burials at Belgrade New Cemetery